is a private university in Inuyama, Aichi, Japan. The predecessor of the school, a junior college, was founded in 1965. The present name was adopted in 1983.

External links
 Official website 

Educational institutions established in 1965
Private universities and colleges in Japan
Universities and colleges in Aichi Prefecture
Inuyama, Aichi
1965 establishments in Japan